Pibiria is a genus consisting of only one species, Pibiria flava. The genus is the only member of the subfamily Pibirioideae (Passifloraceae).

Pibiria flava 
Pibiria flava, the sole member of Pibiria, was identified, but unclassified, in 1993. It is a woody subtropical bush with yellow flowers. DNA, morphology, and reproductive analysis suggests the species is closely related to Turneroideae, but divergent enough to justify a different subfamily. The type specimen was collected at Mabura Hill in central Guyana.

References 

Flora of Guyana
Passifloraceae
Plants described in 2019
Monotypic Malpighiales genera